Oncopeltus zonatus is a species of seed bug in the family Lygaeidae, found in the Neotropics in Guiana, Peru, and Chile. Oncopeltus zonatus is a terrestrial species. Its known host plants are Asclepias curassavica, Funastrum clausum, and Nerium oleander.

References

Lygaeidae
Hemiptera of South America
Insects described in 1848
Taxa named by Wilhelm Ferdinand Erichson